Kristīne Nevarauska-Atkočūne (born 3 March 1981) is a Latvian actress. In the theater, since 2005, she has worked for Dailes teātris, but between 2001 and 2005 she worked for Valmieras Drāmas teātris. She has also taken part in several films.

In 2003 Kristīne received Lielais Kristaps for her role in Sauja ložu. In 2004 she received Shooting Stars Award, which is annually presented to ten young European actors at the Berlin International Film Festival. In 2019 she won her second Best Actress prize at the Lielais Kristaps awards.

Filmography

References

External links

Kristīne Nevarauska at the Dailes teātris homepage

1981 births
Living people
Latvian film actresses
People from Bauska
Latvian stage actresses
Latvian television actresses
Lielais Kristaps Award winners
21st-century Latvian actresses
Latvian Academy of Culture alumni